Xixiang County is a county under the administration of Hanzhong City, in the southwest of Shaanxi province, China, bordering Sichuan province to the southwest. Its administrative center, Xixiang, formerly known as Hsihsiang, lies on the Muma River.

Administrative divisions
As 2019, Xixiang County is divided to 2 subdistricts and 15 towns.
Subdistricts
 Chengbei Subdistrict
 Chengnan Subdistrict

Towns

Climate

Economy
In the 19th century and early 20th century the area produced silk which was exported to Gansu.

Transportation

Xixiang is served by the Yangpingguan–Ankang Railway. The Muma River supports small boat traffic.

Notes

 
County-level divisions of Shaanxi
Hanzhong